Glenn E. Martin (born October 30, 1970) is the president and founder of GEMtrainers.com, a social justice consultancy firm that partners with non-profits from across the United States to assist with fundraising, organizational development and marketing. Glenn is a longstanding American criminal justice reform advocate and is the founder and former president of JustLeadershipUSA (JLUSA). He also founded the campaign, #CLOSErikers and co-founded the Education from the Inside Out Coalition, a national campaign working to remove barriers to higher education facing students while they are in prison and once they are released.

Martin resigned from JLUSA before (December 17, 2017) being accused of sexual misconduct by three women.

Prior to his resignation from JLUSA, Martin regularly commented on criminal justice in the media, including CNN, C-SPAN, Al Jazeera, and MSNBC.

Early life and family
Martin was born and raised in Bedford Stuyvesant, Brooklyn, New York. He is the son of a retired police officer.

New York prison
Martin spent six years incarcerated in New York prisons. In 1994, at the age of 24, Martin was convicted for an armed robbery of a New York City jewelry store and was sentenced to six years in prison. He was detained on Rikers Island for a year and served five additional years in the Wyoming Correctional Facility in Attica, New York, for his role in several armed robberies.

Education
While in prison, Martin took college level courses. Martin views his liberal arts education as a key turning point in his life. While at the Wyoming Correctional Facility, Martin earned an associate degree in social science from the Jesuit Canisius College based in Buffalo, New York. Martin faced barriers to employment with a criminal record even though he had a college degree.

Release
In 2000, Martin was released from prison in upstate Attica, New York. At release, a correctional officer thanked him: "He said my being there helped pay for his boat, and that when my son came there, he would help pay for his son's boat."

United States criminal justice reform
Martin has worked with and founded various criminal justice reform non-profits. Martin also regularly comments on criminal justice issues. Martin has been critical of the disenfranchisement of felons in New York state, and in the United States. In 2014, Martin gave a guest lecture at Bennington College on criminal justice reform.

Legal Action Center
Upon release from prison, Martin began his career with the Legal Action Center (LAC). Martin eventually served as the co-director of LAC's Helping Individuals with criminal records Reenter through Employment (H.I.R.E.) Network. Martin worked to address the obstacles facing ex-offenders who try to reconnect with their communities and society at large. Martin discussed what he viewed as discrimination faced by people with criminal records, based on their criminal records and their race, noting that people of color are disproportionately represented in the American criminal justice system. Martin regularly spoke with media regarding criminal justice issues.

Fortune Society
From 2007 until 2014, Martin served as vice president of development and public affairs for the Fortune Society, a group dedicated to helping people returning from prison to succeed with starting new lives. Half of Fortune Society's staff members were formerly incarcerated, and one-third of the board members were formerly incarcerated.

Martin regularly spoke with the national media about criminal justice issues.

JustLeadershipUSA
In November 2014, Martin founded a new organization, JustLeadershipUSA (JLUSA). JLUSA aims to cut the U.S. correctional population in half by 2030 through advocacy campaigns, leadership trainings, and member engagement. Martin told Mic that he "believes the most compelling advocates of change are those who have been directly affected by incarceration." Martin appeared on the Brian Lehrer show to discuss the purpose of prison. JLUSA hosts training for formerly incarcerated leaders wanting to have a voice in the national debate over criminal justice and prison reform. On February 3, 2018, an article in The New York Times revealed that Martin's departure from JLUSA came after he was accused of sexual misconduct by at least three women of color.

GEMtrainers
In April 2018, Martin founded a new organization, GEMtrainers, LLC. GEMtrainers offers discreet, transformational and business-practical coaching for non-profit business leaders seeking to accelerate their performance and that of their organizations. They assist clients with strengthening their personal and organization positioning, brand story, visual identity, and messaging. GEMtrainers, LLC helps clients to build new, effective brands for their advocacy campaigns, help tear down existing ineffective strategies and neutralize opponents who work to harm movements, by ruthlessly focusing on executing compelling co-created strategies that leave nothing to chance.

White House experience 
In early June 2015, Martin, along with other criminal justice reform activists, were invited to the White House to discuss mass incarceration and law enforcement issues. Martin was flagged by the United States Secret Service as a security risk because of his criminal record, and required to have a special escort in order to enter the White House complex for the discussion. Once cleared, Martin used the incident "to frame the topic for larger criminal justice reform". Ultimately, Martin met with President Obama to discuss JustLeadershipUSA and his efforts to help shrink the criminal justice footprint in the lives of all Americans.

Awards
Never Be Caged "Closest to the Solution" Award (2019) 
Working Families (2017) 
Brooke Russell Astor Award (2017)
Robert F. Kennedy Human Rights Award (2016)
VOCAL 2016 Gala Honoree (2016)
The Root 100 (2015)
Legal Action Center's Arthur L. Liman Public Interest Award (2015)
Crisis to Triumph Award, SUNY Empire State College (2015)
Kentucky Colonel, Highest Honor bestowed by KY Governor Steve Beshear (2014)
Youth Represent (2013)
Hudson Link for College in Prison Brian Fischer Award (2010) 
United States Probation Office of Southern Ohio Achievement Award (2010) 
Exodus Transitional Community: Lonny McLeod Award (2009) 
United States Probation Outstanding Commitment Award (2009) 
Project Build Organization Community Reintegration Programs Award (2009) 
The Laurie L. Scott Visionary Award (2008) 
Kings County District Attorney Citation of Honor (2008) 
National Offender Workforce Development Annual Policy Advocacy Award Winner (2007) 
Citizens Against Recidivism Thurgood Marshall Advocacy Award (2007)

References

External links
Glenn Martin on JustLeadershipUSA via YouTube
Glenn E. Martin Addresses US Human Rights Network Biannual Conference via YouTube
Glenn E. Martin, Keynote speaker at the 2012 National Community Oriented Policing Services Conference via United States Department of Justice and YouTube
Glenn E. Martin on Twitter

American prisoners and detainees
Prison reformers
People from Bedford–Stuyvesant, Brooklyn
American anti-racism activists
African-American activists
Living people
American bloggers
American male writers
Activists from New York (state)
American male bloggers
1970 births
Robert F. Kennedy Human Rights Award laureates
American people convicted of robbery